"I'm in Love with a Memory" was a chart hit for country musician Don Lee. It stayed on the charts for five weeks.

Background
The song was composed by Don Lee and George White. It was released on Crescent 101 in 1981.

Chart performance
The single was a Top Single Pick in the Adult Contemporary section of the January 23, 1982, issue of Billboard. In the March 27, 1982, issue of Billboard, it was announced that Don Lee had another hit with "I'm in Love with a Memory" and it was breaking out with eighteen radio station listed.

The single entered the Cash Box Top 100 Country Singles chart at No. 94 on April 17, 1982. It peaked at No. 85 on May 8, 1982.

References

External links
 Billboard Magazine, March 27, 1982 - Page 70 DON LEE HAS ANOTHER HIT !, "I'm In Love With A Memory

1981 singles
Songs written by Don Lee (musician)